More Fun Comics, originally titled New Fun: The Big Comic Magazine a.k.a. New Fun Comics, was a 1935–1947 American comic book anthology that introduced several major superhero characters and was the first American comic book series to feature solely original material rather than reprints of newspaper comic strips. It was also the first publication of the company that would become DC Comics.

Publication history

In the latter half of 1934, having seen the emergence of Famous Funnies and other oversize magazines reprinting comic strips, Major Malcolm Wheeler-Nicholson founded National Allied Publications and published New Fun #1 on January 11, 1935 (cover-dated February 1935). A tabloid-sized, 10-inch by 15-inch, 36-page magazine with a card-stock, non-glossy cover, it was an anthology of humor features, such as the talking animal comic "Pelion and Ossa" and the college-set "Jigger and Ginger", mixed with such dramatic fare as the Western strip "Jack Woods" and the "yellow peril" adventure "Barry O'Neill", featuring a Fu Manchu-styled villain, Fang Gow. The first issue also featured humor strip "Caveman Capers", an adaptation of the 1819 novel Ivanhoe, spy drama "Sandra of the Secret Service", and a strip based on an early Walt Disney creation Oswald the Lucky Rabbit.

Most significantly, however, whereas some of the existing publications had eventually included a small amount of original material, generally as filler, New Fun #1 was the first comic book containing all-original material. Additionally, it carried advertising, whereas previous comic books were sponsored by corporations such as Procter & Gamble, Kinney Shoes, and Canada Dry beverages, and ad-free. 

The first four issues were edited by future Funnies, Inc., founder Lloyd Jacquet, the next, after a three-month hiatus, by Wheeler-Nicholson himself. Issue #6 (Oct. 1935) brought the comic-book debuts of Jerry Siegel and Joe Shuster, the future creators of Superman, who began their careers with the musketeer swashbuckler "Henri Duval" (doing the first two installments before turning it over to others) and, under the pseudonyms "Leger and Reuths", the supernatural adventurer Doctor Occult. They would remain on the latter title through issue #32 (June 1938), following the magazine's retitling as More Fun (issues #7–8, Jan.-Feb. 1936), and More Fun Comics (#9-on).

In issue #101 (Feb. 1945), Siegel and Shuster introduced Superboy, a teenage version of Superman, in a new feature chronicling the adventures of the Man of Steel when he was a boy growing up in the rural Midwestern United States.

With issue #108 (March 1946), all the superhero features were moved from More Fun into Adventure Comics. More Fun became a humor title that spotlighted the children's fantasy feature "Jimminy and the Magic Book". The book was canceled with issue #127 (Dec 1947).

Features include
Doctor Occult – New Fun #6 – More Fun #33
The Spectre – More Fun #52–101
Doctor Fate – More Fun #55–98
Congo Bill – More Fun #56–67
Johnny Quick – More Fun #71–107
Green Arrow – More Fun #73–107
Aquaman – More Fun #73–107
Superboy – More Fun #101–107

See also
 New Comics

References

Further reading
 Ron Goulart's Great History of Comic Books by Ron Goulart.

External links
.

New Fun Comics issues #1–6 online
More Fun Comics issues #7–32 online

Comics magazines published in the United States
DC Comics titles
Aquaman
1935 comics debuts
1947 comics endings
Comics by Gardner Fox
Magazines established in 1935
Magazines disestablished in 1947
Defunct American comics
Green Arrow
Golden Age comics titles